Morchella casteneae is a species of fungus in the family Morchellaceae (Ascomycota). It was described as new to science in a 2012 study by Clowez and appears to be confined to the Iberian peninsula. A subsequent phylogenetic and nomenclatural study by Richard and colleagues has confirmed M. castaneae as a distinct species and showed the taxa Morchella brunneorosea and Morchella brunneorosea var. sordida to be synonymous.

References

External links

Fungi described in 2012
Fungi of Europe
castaneae